Symphony is the ninth studio album from English soprano singer Sarah Brightman. This classical crossover album is a contrast to her previous collaboration with producer Frank Peterson, 2003's Harem; using a gothic influence instead of a Middle Eastern feel.

The single "Running" was the IAAF's Green Project Charity song, which Brightman performed at their 2007 Championships opening ceremonies in Ōsaka, Japan. An alternate version of the album's first single, "I Will Be with You", featuring Chris Thompson, was the theme song for the tenth Pokémon film: The Rise of Darkrai. The Spanish duet with Fernando Lima, "Pasión", was the theme song for the Mexican soap opera of the same name, and was also released as a single. The London Symphony Orchestra and Brightman's younger sister, Amelia Brightman, are featured on the album.

Singles
 "I Will Be With You" (featuring Chris Thompson / Movie version) (2007)
 "Running" (2007)
 "Pasión" (featuring Fernando Lima) (2007)

Songs
Recorded in Germany, Symphony featured all new songs and was created with Brightman's long-time producer Frank Peterson. The repertoire ranges from ballads such as "Symphony", "Fleurs du Mal" and rock scores "I Will Be With You", originally sung by Norwegian singer Sissel Kyrkjebø. "Jupiter" from Holst's The Planets is adapted on "Running" and Faith Hill's "There You'll Be" is sung in Italian as "Sarai Qui". On this album Brightman reunited with Andrea Bocelli to sing "Canto Della Terra", as well as singing duets with Fernando Lima (Mexican tenor) on "Pasion" and Paul Stanley (from the band Kiss) on "I Will Be With You (Where The Lost Ones Go)". The album showcases Brightman's linguistic vocal skills by singing in Spanish, Italian, French and for the first time in German in the song "Schwere Träume", an adaptation of the fourth movement of Gustav Mahler's fifth symphony.

Live concert album

A PBS special concert was filmed on 16 January 2008 at the Cathedral Stephansdom in Vienna.  This was subsequently shown on PBS stations, premiering on 4 February.  A version of the concert is available from PBS on DVD and the worldwide release of the DVD and live CD was on 10 March 2009.

Album art
The album art for Symphony pictures Brightman in Gothic clothing and surroundings, which was based upon concept art from Guild Wars by Daniel Dociu. The album cover was photographed by long-time collaborator Simon Fowler.

Promotion
On NBC in the United States, Brightman performed several songs from the album on the Progressive Fashion on Ice show on 20 January 2008. Other American television appearances included The Early Show (CBS), The View (ABC), Martha and Fox & Friends.

In Mexico, Televisa selected the song "Pasion" was the theme song of the telenovela, Pasion. In the United Kingdom, Brightman's promotion for the album included appearing on the cookery shows Saturday Kitchen and Ready Steady Cook with Lesley Garrett. Other U.K. television appearances for the album included, Channel 4's The Paul O'Grady Show, ITV's Loose Women, five's The Wright Stuff and the BBC News. Brightman also appeared on radio on Classic FM and Jonathan Ross' show on BBC Radio 2.

During April 2008, Brightman performed with Anne Murray at Canada's Juno Awards and she later appeared in May in the U.K. at the 2008 Classical BRIT Awards.

Track listing

Hidden Track

On certain CD pressings, Running is followed by one minute of silence and an instrumental version of Fleurs du Mal plays, bringing the total track length to 9:11.

Chart performance
In the early 2008 release, the album garnered a remarkable set of chart accolades around the world, including an unprecedented debut in the US Billboard 200 Album chart at 13 (Brightman's highest charting record in the U.S.) moving 32,033 copies in first week. It hit number one in the Mexico International charts and the US Billboard Classical Chart, the top five in Canada and Japan and the top twenty across Europe. In a long term, the album failed to match the success of its predecessors in the United States, but experienced a moderate success in Asia. In Japan the album entered the chart at No. 4 selling 25,815 copies during its first week.

Weekly charts

Certifications and sales

References

External links
 Symphony at Sarah-Brightman.com

Sarah Brightman albums
2008 albums
Albums produced by Frank Peterson
Classical crossover albums